In Greek mythology, King Argalus (Ancient Greek: Ἄργαλος) was a leader of the Lacedaemonid Greeks from the age of legend, now treated as being the Bronze Age in Greece.

Mythology 
Argalus was the eldest son and heir of King Amyklas of Sparta, possibly by his wife, Diomede, daughter of Lapithes. Through this parentage, he was considered to be the brother of King Cynortes (his successor), Hyacinthus, Polyboea, Laodamia (or Leanira), Harpalus, Hegesandre, and in other versions, of Daphne. Argalus was also said to be the father of King Oebalus.

Notes

References 

 Apollodorus, The Library with an English Translation by Sir James George Frazer, F.B.A., F.R.S. in 2 Volumes, Cambridge, MA, Harvard University Press; London, William Heinemann Ltd. 1921. ISBN 0-674-99135-4. Online version at the Perseus Digital Library. Greek text available from the same website.
Dictys Cretensis, from The Trojan War. The Chronicles of Dictys of Crete and Dares the Phrygian translated by Richard McIlwaine Frazer, Jr. (1931-). Indiana University Press. 1966. Online version at the Topos Text Project.
 Parthenius, Love Romances translated by Sir Stephen Gaselee (1882-1943), S. Loeb Classical Library Volume 69. Cambridge, MA. Harvard University Press. 1916.  Online version at the Topos Text Project.
 Parthenius, Erotici Scriptores Graeci, Vol. 1. Rudolf Hercher. in aedibus B. G. Teubneri. Leipzig. 1858. Greek text available at the Perseus Digital Library.
 Pausanias, Description of Greece with an English Translation by W.H.S. Jones, Litt.D., and H.A. Ormerod, M.A., in 4 Volumes. Cambridge, MA, Harvard University Press; London, William Heinemann Ltd. 1918. . Online version at the Perseus Digital Library
Pausanias, Graeciae Descriptio. 3 vols. Leipzig, Teubner. 1903.  Greek text available at the Perseus Digital Library.

Princes in Greek mythology
Mythological kings of Sparta
Kings in Greek mythology
Laconian characters in Greek mythology
Laconian mythology